Sir Ratan Tata Trust (SRTT) came into being in 1919 with a sum of Indian currency 8 million. It is under the ownership of Ratan Tata. Established in accordance with the will of Sir Ratanji Tata, the Trust is now one of the oldest grant bestowing foundations in India.

The Trust has, for about a century, been instrumental in development processes, providing grants to institutions in the areas of rural livelihoods and communities, education, health, enhancing civil society and governance and arts, crafts and culture.

The Trust provides grants and partner with organisations that engage in innovative and sustainable initiatives and with the potential to make a visible difference. It also provides grants for endowments, has a separate programme for small grants and gives grants to individuals for education and medical relief.

SRTT is headed by Arun Pandhi (chief development manager and overall in charge of all programmes) and B. S. Taraporevala (secretary and chief accountant and overall in charge of all administrative and financial matters)

The grants offered by the Trust can be broadly classified as:
 Institutional grants
 Endowment grants
 Small grants
 Individual grants

Institutional grants
The bulk of these grants are in the areas of rural livelihoods and communities and
education. Within rural livelihoods and communities the Trust focuses on key initiatives within
two broad areas:
 Land and water development
 Microfinance

Educational grants
This programme is currently headed by Amrita Patwardhan.

 Reforming elementary education
 Nurturing education as a discipline
 Alternative education
 Higher education

Health grants
This programme is currently headed by Dr. Vikram Gupta.

 Rural health programmes
 Specialised healthcare services
 Health resources and health systems
 Clinical establishment
 Donate poor patients taking treatment in private hospitals.

Grants for enhancing civil society and governance
This programme is currently headed by Vartika Jaini.

 Citizenship and participation
 Human rights and governance
 Governance in civil society

Arts, crafts, and culture

Sustaining livelihoods in performing arts
Under this sub-theme, the Trust focuses on revival of the performing arts with a strong emphasis on the livelihoods of performing artists. This will be achieved through support to:

 Promotion of networks of artist communities
 Encouragement of collective learning and self-help 
 Cultivating markets and audiences
 Enhancing the artists ability to attract financial support and increased performance avenues

Crafts-based livelihoods initiatives
Through this new sub-theme, the SRTT aim to ensure sustenance of crafts and craft communities. The Trust looks to support initiatives that:

 Provide catalytic training for Indian craft artisans
 Ensure the craft artisans attain financial security and the Indian crafts gain market visibility 
 Have potential scaling-up possibilities that can impact large artisan livelihoods

Conservation and digitization
Under this sub-theme, SRTT primarily supports projects to devise strategies by which to conserve national art treasures and enhance public use and access to endangered cultural heritage.

Community media and livelihoods
The Trust supports community based media projects that have the potential to add value to the quality of life of communities, especially in the rural areas.

Endowment grants
The Trust has developed and used endowments to sustain mission-driven institutions that influence positive change in society. It has a formal endowment strategy with well-set norms and clearly defined criteria that enable it to identify and appraise deserving institutions. The endowment portfolio includes Professional Assistance for Development Action (New Delhi), National Council of Applied Economic Research (New Delhi), Child Relief and You (Mumbai), Centre for Science and Environment (New Delhi) and Children's Book Trust (New Delhi).

Emergency grants
Tata Sons and Ratan Tata donated 1,500 crore to the PM CARES Fund to fight against the COVID-19 pandemic in India.

Small grants
The Sir Ratan Tata Small Grant Programme (SGP) was launched in 1998–99. These grants cater to the needs of small, welfare-oriented organisations, and those needing support to implement innovative ideas. It was later amended to accommodate the worthy larger organisations that needed funding for strategic planning, focused research activities, or strengthening internal systems.

Individual grants
The Individual Grants Programme of the Trust provides financial help for:

 Meeting medical contingencies
 Scholars pursuing higher education in India and assistance for education-related overseas travel.

References

External links

Charities based in India
Tata institutions